

L

 L.A. Confidential (1997)
 L.A. Story (1991)
 L.I.E. (2001)
 L.O.R.D: Legend of Ravaging Dynasties (2016)
 L'arma (1978)
 L'Animale (2018)
 L'ora legale (2017)

La

 La Bamba (1987)
 La La La at Rock Bottom (2015)
 La La Land (2016)

Laa-Lac

 Laaj (2003)
 Laal Singh Chaddha (2022)
 The Lab (2013)
 Labou (2008)
 The Labour Leader (1917)
 Labyrinth: (1959, 1986, 1991 & 2002)
 Labyrinth of Cinema (2019)
 Lace: (1926 & 1928)
 Lace Crater (2015)
 The Lace Wars (1965)
 The Lacemaker (1977)
 Laces (2018)
 Lachhi (1949)
 The Lackey and the Lady (1919)
 Lacombe Lucien (1974)
 The Lacquered Box (1932)

Lad

 The Lad (1935)
 The Lad from Old Ireland (1910)
 Lad from Our Town (1942)
 Lad, A Dog (1962)
 Lad, A Yorkshire Story (2013)
 Ladaai (1989)
 Ladaai Ke Baad (1943)
 Ladaaku (1981)
 Ladakh Chale Rickshawala (2019)
 Ladder 49 (2004)
 The Ladder of Lies (1920)
 Laddie Be Good (1928)
 Laddu Babu (2014)
 Ladies in Black (2018)
 Ladies of the Chorus (1948)
 Ladies Courageous (1944)
 Ladies Crave Excitement (1935)
 Ladies in Distress (1938)
 Ladies Doctor (1996)
 Ladies at Ease (1927)
 Ladies First (2017)
 Ladies and Gentleman (2013)
 Ladies & Gentlemen (2015)
 Ladies and Gentlemen, The Fabulous Stains (2003)
 Ladies and Gentlewomen (2017)
 Ladies Hostel (1973)
 Ladies Invite Gentlemen (1980)
 Ladies in Lavender (2004)
 Ladies Love Brutes (1930)
 Ladies Love Danger (1935)
 The Ladies Man: (1961 & 2000)
 Ladies of the Mob (1928)
 Ladies Must Live: (1921 & 1940)
 Ladies Must Love (1933)
 Ladies Must Play (1930)
 Ladies Only: (1939 & unreleased)
 Ladies at Play (1926)
 Ladies They Talk About (1933)
 Ladies Who Do (1963)
 Ladies' Choice (1980)
 Ladies' Day (1943)
 Ladies' Man: (1931 & 1947)
 Ladies' Night (2003)
 Ladies' Night in a Turkish Bath (1928)
 Ladies' Tango (1983)
 The Lads (2018)
 The Lady: (1925 & 2011)
 Lady Bird (2017)
 Lady of Burlesque (1943)
 Lady in a Cage (1964)
 Lady Caroline Lamb (1972)
 Lady in Cement (1968)
 Lady Chatterley (2006)
 Lady Chatterley's Lover: (1955, 1981, 2015 TV & 2022)
 Lady Cocoa (1975)
 Lady in the Dark (1944)
 Lady for a Day (1933)
 Lady Death: The Movie (2004)
 The Lady with the Dog (1960)
 The Lady and the Duke (2001)
 Lady of the Dynasty (2015)
 The Lady Eve (1941)
 Lady Frankenstein (1971)
 Lady Be Good: (1928 & 1941)
 Lady Helen's Escapade (1909)
 Lady Jane: (1986 & 2008)
 Lady Jayne: Killer (2003)
 Lady Killer (1933)
 Lady in the Lake (1947)
 The Lady of the Lake (1928)
 Lady Macbeth (2016)
 Lady Macbeth of the Mtsensk District (1989)
 Lady of the Manor (2021)
 Lady for a Night (1942)
 Lady of the Night: (1925 & 1986)
 Lady of the Pavements (1929)
 The Lady in Question: (1940 & 1999 TV)
 The Lady from Shanghai (1948)
 Lady Sings the Blues (1972)
 Lady with the Small Foot (1920)
 Lady Snowblood (1973)
 A Lady Takes a Chance (1943)
 Lady on a Train (1945)
 Lady and the Tramp: (1955 & 2019)
 Lady and the Tramp II: Scamp's Adventure (2001)
 The Lady in the Van (2015)
 The Lady Vanishes: (1938, 1979 & 2013)
 Lady Vengeance (2005)
 Lady in the Water (2006)
 Lady in White (1988)
 The Lady Is Willing: (1934 & 1942)
 Lady Windermere's Fan: (1916, 1925, 1935 & 1944)
 A Lady Without Passport (1950)
 Lady, Let's Dance (1944)
 Lady, Play Your Mandolin! (1931)
 The Ladybird (1927)
 Ladybird, Ladybird (1994)
 Ladybug Ladybug (1963)
 Ladybugs (1992)
 Ladyhawke (1985)
 The Ladykillers: (1955 & 2004)
 Ladyworld (2018)

Laf-Lar

 Lafayette Escadrille (1958)
 Lagaam (1976)
 Lagaan (2001)
 Lagan (1941)
 Lagardère (2003)
 Lage Raho Munna Bhai (2006)
 Lagna Pahave Karun (2013)
 Lagna Pathrike (1967)
 Lagos Cougars (2013)
 Laheri Badmash (1944)
 Laheri Cameraman (1944) 
 Laheri Jeewan (1941)
 Lahiri Lahiri Lahirilo (2002)
 Lahore (2010)
 Lahore Se Aagey (2016)
 Lahu Ke Do Rang: (1979 & 1997)
 Lahure (1989)
 Lai Bhaari (2014)
 Lai Shi, China's Last Eunuch (1988)
 Laid in America (2016)
 Laid to Rest (2009)
 Laila: (1929, 1984 & 1997)
 Laila Majnu: (1949, 1950, 1962, 1976 & 2018)
 The Lair of the White Worm (1988)
 Lajja (2001)
 Lajjaavathi (1979)
 Lake City (2008)
 Lake Dead (2008)
 Lake of the Dead (1958)
 Lake of Dracula (1971)
 Lake Eerie (2016)
 Lake of Fire (2006)
 The Lake House (2006)
 Lake of Ladies (1934)
 Lake Mungo (2008)
 Lake Placid series:
 Lake Placid (1999)
 Lake Placid 2 (2007) (TV)
 Lake Placid 3 (2010) (TV)
 Lake Placid: The Final Chapter (2012) (TV)
 Lake Placid vs. Anaconda (2015) (TV)
 Lake Placid: Legacy (2018) (TV)
 Lake Placid Serenade (1944)
 Lake of Tears (1966)
 Lakeboat (2000)
 Lakeer – Forbidden Lines (2004)
 Lakeview Terrace (2008)
 Lakh Taka (1953)
 Lakhan (1979)
 Lakhipurgi Lakhipyari (2007)
 Lakhon Hain Yahan Dilwale (2015)
 Lakhon Ki Baat (1984)
 Lakhon Me Ek (1971)
 Lakhon Mein Aik (1967)
 Laki-Laki Tak Bernama (1969)
 Lakshya (2004)
 Lala's Gun (2008)
 Lamb: (1986, 2015 American, 2015 Ethiopian & 2021)
 The Lamb: (1915, 1918 & 2014)
 Lambada (1990)
 Lambchops (1929)
 Lamborghini: The Man Behind the Legend (2022)
 The Lame Devil (1948, French: Le Diable boiteux)
 Lamerica (1994)
 Lammbock (2001)
 Lan Yu (2001)
 Lancelot du Lac (1974)
 Land: (2018 & 2021)
 The Land Before Time series:
 The Land Before Time (1988)
 The Land Before Time II: The Great Valley Adventure (1994)
 The Land Before Time III: The Time of the Great Giving (1995)
 The Land Before Time IV: Journey Through the Mists (1996)
 The Land Before Time V: The Mysterious Island (1997)
 The Land Before Time VI: The Secret of Saurus Rock (1998)
 The Land Before Time VII: The Stone of Cold Fire (2000)
 The Land Before Time VIII: The Big Freeze (2001)
 The Land Before Time IX: Journey to Big Water (2002)
 The Land Before Time X: The Great Longneck Migration (2003)
 The Land Before Time XI: Invasion of the Tinysauruses (2005)
 The Land Before Time XII: The Great Day of the Flyers (2006)
 The Land Before Time XIII: The Wisdom of Friends (2007)
 The Land Before Time XIV: Journey of the Brave (2016)
 Land Beyond the Sunset (1912)
 Land of the Blind (2006)
 Land of the Dead (2005)
 Land and Freedom (1995)
 Land of Look Behind (1982)
 Land of the Lost (2009)
 Land of Mine (2015)
 Land of the Pharaohs (1955)
 Land of Plenty (2004)
 Land Raiders (1970)
 Land of Silence and Darkness (1971)
 The Land That Time Forgot: (1975 & 2009)
 Land Without Bread (1933)
 The Landlord (1970)
 Landru (1963)
 Landscape in the Mist (1988)
 Landscape Suicide (1987)
 Lanfranchi's Memorial Discotheque (2010)
 Language Lessons (2021)
 Lani Loa (1998)
 Lansky: (1999 TV & 2021)
 Lantana (2001)
 Lapin kullan kimallus (1999)
 Lapitch the Little Shoemaker (1997)
 Lapsis (2020)
 Laputa: Castle in the Sky (1986)
 Lara Croft: Tomb Raider – The Cradle of Life (2003)
 Lara Croft: Tomb Raider (2001)
 The Laramie Project (2002)
 Larceny: (1948 & 2004)
 Larceny, Inc. (1942)
 Larger than Life (1996)
 Larki Panjaban (2003)
 Larks on a String (1969)
 Larry the Cable Guy: Health Inspector (2006)
 Larry Crowne (2011)
 Lars and the Real Girl (2007)
 Larva (2012)

Las

 The Las Vegas Story (1952)
 Laser Mission (1990)
 Laserblast (1978)
 Lassie series:
 Lassie: (1994 & 2005)
 Lassie Come Home (1943)
 Last Action Hero (1993)
 The Last Airbender (2010)
 The Last American Hero (1973)
 The Last American Virgin (1982)
 The Last Billionaire (1934)
 The Last Black Man in San Francisco (2019)
 The Last Blockbuster (2020)
 The Last Bohemian: (1912 & 1931)
 The Last Boy Scout (1991)
 The Last Broadcast (1998)
 The Last Bus (2021)
 The Last Butterfly (1991)
 Last Cab to Darwin (2015)
 Last Call: (1991, 1995 & 2002)
 Last Cannibal World (1978)
 The Last Castle (2001)
 The Last Challenge (1967)
 Last Chance Harvey (2008)
 Last Christmas (2019)
 The Last Command: (1928 & 1955)
 The Last Company (1930)
 Last Dance: (1996 & 2012)
 Last Day of Summer (2009)
 The Last Day of Summer: (1958 & 2007 TV)
 Last Days: (2005 & 2014)
 Last Days in the Desert (2015)
 The Last Days of Disco (1998)
 Last Days in Havana (2016)
 The Last Days of Pompeii: (1908, 1913, 1926, 1935, 1950 & 1959)
 The Last Days of Pompeo (1937)
 Last Days in Vietnam (2014)
 The Last Detail (1973)
 Last of the Dogmen (1995)
 The Last Dragon (1985)
 The Last Duel: (1981 & 2021)
 Last Embrace (1979)
 The Last Emperor (1987)
 The Last of England (1987)
 Last Exit: (2003 & 2006)
 Last Exit to Brooklyn (1990)
 The Last Exorcism (2010)
 The Last Exorcism Part II (2013)
 The Last Five Years (2015)
 Last Flag Flying (2017)
 The Last Hill (1944)
 Last Holiday: (1950 & 2006)
 The Last Horror Film (1982)
 The Last Horror Movie (2003)
 Last House on Dead End Street (1973)
 The Last House on the Left: (1972 & 2009)
 Last House Standing (2004)
 The Last Hunt (1956)
 The Last Hurrah: (1958, 1977 TV & 2009)
 Last Hurrah for Chivalry (1979)
 The Last King of Scotland (2006)
 The Last Kiss: (2001 & 2006)
 Last Knight (2017)
 The Last Laugh: (1924, 2016 & 2019)
 The Last Legion (2007)
 The Last Letter from Your Lover (2021)
 Last Life in the Universe (2003)
 Last Looks (2022)
 Last Love: (1935, 1947, 1949, 2007 & 2013)
 The Last Man on Earth: (1924, 1964 & 2011)
 Last Man Standing (1996)
 The Last Married Couple in America (1980)
 The Last Matinee (2020)
 The Last Mercenary: (1968 & 2021)
 The Last Metro (1980)
 The Last Mimzy (2007)
 Last of the Mobile Hot Shots (1970)
 The Last of the Mohicans: (1911, 1920 American, 1920 German, 1936, 1968, 1977 TV & 1992)
 The Last Movie (1971)
 The Last Movie Star (2017)
 Last of the Mustangs (2006)
 The Last: Naruto the Movie (2014)
 Last Night: (1964, 1998 & 2010)
 Last Night at the Alamo (1983)
 The Last Night of the Barbary Coast (1913)
 The Last Night of Scheherazade (1987)
 Last Night in Soho (2021)
 A Last Note (1995)
 Last Order: Final Fantasy VII (2005)
 Last Orders (2002)
 The Last Picture Show (1971)
 The Last Polka (1984)
 Last Present (2001)
 The Last Quarter (2004)
 The Last Remake of Beau Geste (1977)
 Last Resort: (1986 & 2000)
 The Last Resort (2018)
 The Last Reunion (1982)
 Last Rites: (1975 & 1988)
 Last Rites of the Dead (2006)
 The Last Rites of Joe May (2011)
 The Last Romantic (1985) (TV)
 The Last Samurai (2003)
 The Last Seduction (1994)
 The Last Seduction II (1999)
 The Last of Sheila (1973)
 The Last Song: (1980 TV & 2010)
 The Last Stage (1947)
 The Last Stand: (1938, 1984 & 2013)
 The Last Starfighter (1984)
 The Last Station (2009)
 The Last Step (2012)
 The Last Stop (2012)
 Last Stop on the Night Train (1975)
 Last Summer (1969)
 The Last Sunset (1961)
 The Last Supper: (1976, 1994, 1995, 2003, 2006 & 2012)
 The Last Survivors (2014)
 Last Tango in Paris (1972)
 The Last Temptation of Christ (1988)
 The Last Ten Days (1955)
 The Last Thanksgiving (2020)
 The Last Thing He Wanted (2020)
 The Last Time (2006)
 The Last Time I Saw Paris (1954)
 The Last Tomahawk (1965)
 Last Train from Gun Hill (1959)
 The Last Train from Madrid (1937)
 The Last Tree (2019)
 The Last Tycoon: (1976 & 2012)
 The Last Unicorn (1982)
 The Last Valley (1971)
 Last Vegas (2013)
 The Last Vermeer (2019)
 The Last Voyage (1960)
 The Last Voyage of the Demeter (2023)
 The Last Waltz (1976)
 The Last War (1961)
 The Last Warning: (1928 & 1939)
 The Last Warrior: (1970, 2000 & 2017)
 The Last Warrior: A Messenger of Darkness (2021)
 The Last Warrior: Root of Evil (2021)
 The Last Wave (1977)
 Last Wedding (2001)
 The Last Winter: (1960, 1984, 1989 & 2006)
 The Last Witch Hunter (2015)
 Last Woman on Earth (1960)
 The Last Women Standing (2015)
 The Last Word: (1973, 1975, 1979, 2008, 2009 & 2017)
 Last Words: (1968 & 2020)
 Last Year at Marienbad (1961)

Lat-Laz

 Late August at the Hotel Ozone (1967)
 Late Autumn: (1960 & 2010)
 Late for Dinner (1991)
 The Late George Apley (1947)
 Late Marriage (2001)
 Late Night (2019)
 Late Night Shopping (2001)
 Late Phases (2014)
 A Late Quartet (2012)
 The Late Shift (1996) (TV)
 The Late Show (1977)
 Late Spring (1949)
 The Late, Great Planet Earth (1978)
 Latitude Zero (1969)
 Latter Days (2003)
 Laughing at Death (1929)
 Laughing Gas (1914)
 Laughing Gravy (1931)
 Laughing Heirs (1933)
 The Laughing Policeman (1974)
 Laughter in Paradise (1951)
 Laura: (1944, 1968 TV & 1979) 
 Laura Lansing Slept Here (1988) (TV)
 Laure (1976)
 Laurel Canyon (2002)
 Laurence Anyways (2012)
 Lavender: (1953, 2000, 2015, 2016 & 2019)
 The Lavender Hill Mob (1951)
 Lavoura Arcaica (2001)
 Law Abiding Citizen (2009)
 Law of the Border (1966)
 Law of Desire (1987)
 Law and Order: (1932, 1940, 1942, 1953 & 1969)
 Lawless (2012)
 The Lawless Nineties (1936)
 Lawman (1971)
 Lawn Dogs (1997)
 The Lawnmower Man (1992)
 Lawnmower Man 2: Beyond Cyberspace (1996)
 Lawrence of Arabia (1962)
 Laws of Attraction (2004)
 Laws of Gravity (1992)
 Layer Cake (2004)
 Layla and Majnun (1937)
 Lazarus (1902)
 The Lazarus Effect: (2010 TV & 2015)
 The Lazarus Project (2008)
 Lazer Team (2015)
 Lazer Team 2 (2017)

Le

 The Lead Singer and Dancer and His Woman (2015)
 Leadbelly (1976)
 The Leading Man (1996)
 The League of Extraordinary Gentlemen (2003)
 The League of Gentlemen (1960)
 The League of Gentlemen's Apocalypse (2005)
 League of Gods (2016)
 A League of Their Own (1992)
 Lean on Me (1989)
 Leap of Faith (1992)
 Leap Year: (1924, 1932 & 2010)
 Leapin' Leprechauns! (1995)
 Learning to Drive (2014)
 Learning to Lie (2003)
 The Learning Tree (1969)
 Lease Wife (2006)
 The Leather Boys (1964)
 Leather Face (1939)
 Leather Stocking (1909)
 Leatherface (2017)
 Leatherface: The Texas Chainsaw Massacre III (1990)
 Leatherheads (2008)
 Leave 'Em Laughing (1928)
 Leave Her to Heaven (1945)
 Leave It to Beaver (1997)
 Leaves of Grass (2010)
 Leaves from Satan's Book (1920)
 Leaving Las Vegas (1995)
 Leaving Metropolis (2002)
 Leaving Neverland (2019)
 Leaving Normal (1992)
 Lebanon (2009)
 Led Zeppelin DVD (2003)
 The Ledge (2011)
 Lee Dae-ro Can't Die (2005)
 Lee Daniels' The Butler (2013)
 Lee Rock (1991)
 Lee Rock II (1991)
 The Leech: (1921, 1956 & 2022)
 Leeches! (2003)
 Left Behind series:
 Left Behind (2014)
 Left Behind: The Movie (2000)
 Left Behind: World at War (2005)
 Left Behind II: Tribulation Force (2002)
 The Left Hand of God (1955)
 The Left Handed Gun (1958)
 Left Luggage (1998)
 Left-Hander (1964)
 The Left-Hander (1987)
 The Leg Fighters (1980)
 Legacy: (1998, 2000, 2008 & 2010)
 The Legacy: (1978 & 2009)
 The Legacy of Pretoria (1934)
 The Legacy of a Whitetail Deer Hunter (2018)
 Legacy: A Mormon Journey (1990)
 Legal Eagles (1986)
 Legally Blonde series:
 Legally Blonde (2001)
 Legally Blonde 2: Red, White & Blonde (2003)
 Legally Blondes (2009)
 Legend: (1985, 2014 & 2015)
 The Legend (2012)
 The Legend of the 7 Golden Vampires (1974)
 The Legend of 1900 (1998)
 Legend of the Ancient Sword (2018)
 The Legend of Bagger Vance (2000)
 The Legend of Billie Jean (1985)
 The Legend of Boggy Creek (1972)
 The Legend of Buddha (2004)
 Legend of the Demon Cat (2017)
 Legend of the Guardians: The Owls of Ga'Hoole (2010)
 The Legend of Hell House (1973)
 The Legend of Hercules (2014)
 The Legend of the Holy Drinker (1988)
 The Legend Hunters (TBD)
 The Legend of the Lone Ranger (1981)
 Legend of the Lost (1957)
 Legend of the Moles series:
 Legend of the Moles: The Frozen Horror (2011)
 Legend of the Moles: The Treasure of Scylla (2012)
 Legend of the Moles – The Magic Train Adventure (2015)
 Legend of the Mountain (1979)
 Legend of the Phantom Rider (2002)
 Legend of a Rabbit: The Martial of Fire (2015)
 The Legend of Rita (2000)
 The Legend of Silent Night (1968) (TV)
 The Legend of Sleepy Hollow: (1949 & 1980 TV)
 The Legend of Suram Fortress (1985)
 The Legend of Suriyothai (2001)
 Legend of Tianyun Mountain (1980)
 Legend of the Werewolf (1975)
 The Legend of the White Serpent (1956)
 The Legend of Zorro (2005)
 The Legend of Zu (2001)
 Legendary (2010)
 Legendary Weapons of China (1982)
 Legends of the Fall (1994)
 Legends of Oz: Dorothy's Return (2013)
 Legion: (1998 TV & 2010)
 The Legion (2020)
 Legion of the Night (1995)
 Legionnaire (1998)
 Lego series:
 Lego: The Adventures of Clutch Powers (2010)
 Lego Batman: The Movie – DC Super Heroes Unite (2013)
 The Lego Movie (2014)
 Lego DC Comics Super Heroes: Justice League vs. Bizarro League (2015)
 Lego DC Comics Super Heroes: Justice League – Attack of the Legion of Doom (2015)
 Lego DC Comics Super Heroes: Justice League – Cosmic Clash (2016)
 Lego Scooby-Doo! Haunted Hollywood (2016)
 Lego DC Comics Super Heroes: Justice League – Gotham City Breakout (2016)
 The Lego Batman Movie (2017)
 Lego Scooby-Doo! Blowout Beach Bash (2017)
 Lego DC Super Hero Girls: Brain Drain (2017)
 The Lego Ninjago Movie (2017)
 Lego DC Comics Super Heroes: The Flash (2018)
 Lego DC Super Hero Girls: Super-Villain High (2018)
 Lego DC Comics Super Heroes: Aquaman: Rage of Atlantis (2018)
 The Lego Movie 2: The Second Part (2019)
 Lego DC Batman: Family Matters (2019)
 Lego DC: Shazam!: Magic and Monsters (2020)
 Legong: Dance of the Virgins (1935)
 Leila and the Wolves (1984)
 The Leisure Class (2015)
 The Leisure Seeker (2017)
 Leiutajateküla Lotte (2006)
 Lel Chamel (2010)
 Lemming (2006)
 Lemon Popsicle (1978)
 Lemonade Joe (1964)
 Lemonade Mouth (2011) (TV)
 Lemony Snicket's A Series of Unfortunate Events (2004)
 Lemora (1973)
 Lenin in Paris (1981)
 Leningrad Cowboys Go America (1989)
 Lenny (1974)
 Lenny Cooke (2013)
 Leo: (2000, 2002 & 2012)
 Leon the Pig Farmer (1992)
 Léon: The Professional (1994)
 Leona (2018)
 Leonard Part 6 (1987)
 Leonardo's Diary (1972)
 The Leopard: (1918 & 1963)
 The Leopard Man (1943)
 Leprechaun series:
 Leprechaun (1993)
 Leprechaun 2 (1994)
 Leprechaun 3 (1995)
 Leprechaun 4: In Space (1997)
 Leprechaun in the Hood (2000)
 Leprechaun: Back 2 tha Hood (2003)
 Leprechaun: Origins (2014)
 Leprechaun Returns (2018)
 Leptirica (1973) (TV)
 Leroy & Stitch (2006) (TV)
 Lesbian Vampire Killers (2009)
 Less than Zero (1987)
 The Lesser Evil: (1912 & 1998)
 Lessons of Darkness (1992)
 Let the Corpses Tan (2017)
 Let George Do It! (1940)
 Let Him Go (2020)
 Let Him Have It (1992)
 Let Hoi Decide (2014)
 Let It Be (1970)
 Let It Ride (1989)
 Let It Shine (2012)
 Let It Snow: (2001, 2019 & 2020)
 Let Me Die a Woman (1978)
 Let Me In (2010)
 Let Me Make You a Martyr (2016)
 Let the Right One In (2008)
 Let Sleeping Corpses Lie (1974)
 Let the Sunshine In (2017)
 Let Them All Talk (2020)
 Let Them Chirp Awhile (2009)
 Let Us In (2021)
 Let Us Prey (2014)
 Let's All Go To the Lobby (1957)
 Let's Get Married (2015)
 Let's Get Skase (2001)
 Let's Go Crazy (1951)
 Let's Go to Prison (2006)
 Let's Make Love (1960)
 Let's Make a Movie (2010)
 Let's Scare Jessica to Death (1971)
 Lethal Love (2021)
 Lethal Weapon series:
 Lethal Weapon (1987)
 Lethal Weapon 2 (1989)
 Lethal Weapon 3 (1992)
 Lethal Weapon 4 (1998)
 The Letter: (1929 & 1940)
 Letter to Brezhnev (1985)
 Letter with Feather (1954)
 Letter to Jane (1972)
 Letter Never Sent (1960)
 The Letter Room (2020)
 A Letter to Three Wives (1949)
 Letter from an Unknown Woman: (1948 & 2004)
 Letters from Iwo Jima (2006)
 Letters to Juliet (2010)
 Lettre à la prison (1969)
 Leviathan: (1989, 2012 & 2014)
 Levity (2003)
 Lewis and Clark and George (1997)
 Ley Lines (1999)
 Ley's Line (2002)
 Leysa Leysa (2002)
 Léolo (1992)
 Léon Morin, Priest (1961)
 Léon: The Professional (1994)
 Léonor (1975)

Li

 Li Lianying: The Imperial Eunuch (1991)

Lia-Lim

 Les Liaisons dangereuses (1959)
 Li'l Abner: (1940 & 1959)
 Liam (2000)
 Lianna (1983)
 Liar Liar (1997)
 Libeled Lady (1936)
 Liberal Arts (2012)
 The Liberation of L.B. Jones (1970)
 Liberté (2019)
 Liberté I (1962)
 The Libertine: (2000 & 2005)
 Liberty: (1929 & 1986 TV)
 Liberty Heights (1999)
 Liberty! The American Revolution (1997) (TV)
 Libido: (1965, 1973 & 2013)
 The Librarian series:
 The Librarian: Quest for the Spear (2004) (TV)
 The Librarian: Return to King Solomon's Mines (2006) (TV)
 The Librarian: Curse of the Judas Chalice (2008) (TV)
 The Librarians (2003)
 Library Wars: The Last Mission (2015)
 Licántropo (1996)
 Licence to Kill (1989)
 License to Drive (1988)
 License to Wed (2007)
 Lick the Star (1998)
 Licorice Pizza (2021)
 Lie with Me (2005)
 Liebestraum (1991)
 Lies My Mother Told Me (2005)
 Life: (1999 & 2017)
 Life 101 (1995)
 The Life and Adventures of Nicholas Nickleby: (1947, 1982 & 2001 TV)
 The Life and Adventures of Santa Claus: (1985 TV & 2000)
 Life After Beth (2014)
 The Life Ahead (2020)
 The Life Aquatic with Steve Zissou (2004)
 Life is Beautiful: (1979, 1985, 1997, 2000, 2012 & 2014)
 Life Is a Bed of Roses (1983)
 The Life Before Her Eyes (2007)
 The Life Before This (1999)
 Life Between the Waters (2017)
 Life of Brian (1979)
 The Life of Buddha (2007)
 Life Is Cheap... But Toilet Paper Is Expensive (1989)
 Life Is Cool (2008)
 Life Dances On (1937)
 The Life of David Gale (2003)
 Life in a Day: (1999 & 2011)
 Life in a Day 2020 (2021)
 The Life and Death of 9413: a Hollywood Extra (1928)
 The Life and Death of Colonel Blimp (1943)
 The Life and Death of King Richard II (1960) (TV)
 The Life and Death of Peter Sellers (2004)
 The Life and Death of a Porno Gang (2009)
 Life During Wartime (2009)
 The Life of Emile Zola (1937)
 Life at the End of the Rainbow (2002)
 Life of an Expert Swordsman (1959)
 Life and Extraordinary Adventures of Private Ivan Chonkin (1994)
 Life with Father (1947)
 Life With Feathers (1945)
 Life in a Fishbowl (2014)
 Life as a House (2001)
 Life Itself: (2014 & 2018)
 A Life Less Ordinary (1997)
 Life Is a Long Quiet River (1988)
 Life with Mikey (1993)
 Life Is a Miracle (2004)
 Life and Nothing But (1989)
 Life and Nothing More (2017)
 The Life of Oharu (1952)
 Life of Pi (2012)
 Life of Riley (2014)
 The Life of Riley: (1927 & 1949)
 Life Show (2002)
 Life or Something Like It (2002)
 A Life at Stake (1954)
 Life Stinks (1991)
 Life Story (1987) (TV)
 Life on a String (1991)
 Life is Sweet (1990)
 The Life and Times of Grizzly Adams (1974)
 The Life and Times of Judge Roy Bean (1972)
 The Life and Times of Rosie the Riveter (1980)
 The Life and Times of Sarah Baartman (1998)
 The Life and Times of Xaviera Hollander (1974)
 Life Is Tough, Eh Providence? (1972)
 Life as We Know It (2010)
 Life Without Dick (2001)
 The Life of Wu Xun (1950)
 Life, and Nothing More... (1992)
 Life-Size (2000) (TV)
 Lifeboat (1944)
 Lifechanger (2018)
 Lifeforce (1985)
 The Lifeguard (2013)
 Liger (2022)
 The Light Between Oceans (2016)
 Light of Day (1987)
 Light the Fuse... Sartana Is Coming (1970)
 Light House (1976) 
 Light It Up (1999)
 Light of My Life (2019)
 Light Sleeper (1992)
 Light Years (1988)
 Light Years (2015)
 The Lighthorsemen (1987)
 Lighthouse (1999)
 The Lighthouse: (1998, 2016 & 2019)
 Lightning Jack (1994)
 Lightning Over Water (1980)
 Lights in the Dusk (2006)
 Lights of New York: (1916 & 1928)
 Lights Out: (1953, 2010, 2013 & 2016)
 Lightyear (2022)
 Like Crazy: (2011 & 2016)
 Like Father Like Son (1987)
 Like Father, like Son (2013)
 Like for Likes (2016)
 Like Mike (2002)
 Like Mike 2: Streetball (2006)
 Like Someone in Love (2012)
 Like Stars on Earth (2007)
 Like Sunday, Like Rain (2014)
 Like a Virgin (2006)
 Like Water for Chocolate (1992)
 The Likely Lads (1976)
 Lil' Pimp (2005)
 Lila Says (2004)
 Lili (1953)
 Lilies (1997)
 Lilies of the Field: (1924, 1930, 1934 & 1963)
 Lilith (1964)
 Lilja 4-ever (2002)
 Lilo & Stitch (2002)
 Lilo & Stitch 2: Stitch Has a Glitch (2005)
 Lily of Killarney: (1929 & 1934)
 Limbo: (1972, 1999, 2010, 2020 & 2021)
 The Limehouse Golem (2016)
 Limelight: (1936, 1952 & 2011)
 The Limey (1999)
 Limite (1931)
 Limitless (2011)
 The Limits of Control (2009)
 The Limping Man: (1936 & 1953)

Lin-Liz

 Lincoln: (1988 TV & 2012)
 The Lincoln Conspiracy (1977)
 The Lincoln Lawyer (2011)
 Linda: (1929, 1960, 1973 TV & 1993 TV)
 The Lindbergh Kidnapping Case (1976) (TV)
 Line of Demarcation (1966)
 Line of Descent (2019)
 Line Walker (2016)
 Lines of Wellington (2012)
 Linger (2008)
 La Lingerie (2008)
 A Lingering Face (2000)
 Link (1986)
 Lion: (2006, 2014, 2015 & 2016)
 The Lion (1962)
 The Lion of Amalfi (1950)
 The Lion Has Wings (1939)
 The Lion King series:
 The Lion King: (1994 & 2019)
 The Lion King II: Simba's Pride (1998)
 The Lion King 1½ (2004)
 The Lion of Punjab (2011)
 The Lion in Winter: (1968 & 2003 TV)
 The Lion Woman (2016)
 Lionheart: (1987, 1990, 2016 & 2018)
 Lions for Lambs (2007)
 Lip Service (1988) (TV)
 Lips of Lurid Blue (1975)
 Lipstick: (1960 & 1976)
 Liquid Dreams (1991)
 Liquid Sky (1982)
 Lisa: (1978, 1990 & 2001)
 Lisa and the Devil (1974)
 Lisa Picard Is Famous (2000)
 Lisammayude Veedu (2013)
 Lisbon: (1956 & 1999)
 Lisbon Story: (1946 & 1994)
 Liselotte of the Palatinate (1966)
 Lisinski (1944)
 Lissy (1957)
 The List of Adrian Messenger (1963)
 Lista de Espera (2000)
 Listen: (2013 & 2020)
 Listen... Amaya (2013)
 Listen to Britain (1942)
 Listen, Darling (1938)
 Listen, Judge (1952)
 Listen Lena (1927)
 Listen Lester (1924)
 Listen, Let's Make Love (1969)
 Listen to Me (1989)
 Listen to Me Marlon (2015)
 Listen to My Heart (2009)
 Listen to My Song (1959)
 Listen Up Philip (2014)
 Lisztomania (1975)
 Lisístrata (2002)
 Le Lit (1982) 
 Little Ashes (2009)
 The Little Bear Movie (2001)
 Little Big League (1994)
 Little Big Man (1970)
 Little Big Panda (2011)
 Little Black Book (2004)
 Little Boy Lost: (1953 & 1978)
 Little Buddha (1993)
 Little Caesar (1931)
 A Little Chaos (2014)
 Little Children (2006)
 Little Cigars (1973)
 Little Darlings (1980)
 The Little Death: (2006 & 2014)
 Little Deaths (2011)
 Little Dieter Needs to Fly (1997)
 Little Dorrit: (1920, 1924, 1934 & 1987)
 Little Dragon Maiden (1983)
 The Little Drummer Boy (1968) (TV)
 The Little Drummer Girl (1984)
 The Little Engine That Could: (1991 & 2011)
 Little England (2013)
 Little Fauss and Big Halsy (1970)
 Little Fish: (2005 & 2021)
 Little Fockers (2010)
 The Little Foxes (1941)
 Little Fugitive: (1953, 1966 & 2006)
 Little Giants (1994)
 The Little Girl Who Lives Down the Lane (1976)
 The Little Hours (2017)
 The Little House (2014)
 The Little House in Kolomna (1913)
 The Little Hut (1957)
 Little John (2002)
 Little Ladies of the Night (1977) (TV)
 Little Man: (2005 & 2006)
 Little Man Tate (1991)
 Little Man, What Now?: (1933 & 1934)
 Little Manhattan (2005)
 The Little Mermaid: (1968, 1976 Czech, 1976 Russian & 2018)
 The Little Mermaid series:
 The Little Mermaid: (1989 & 2023)
 The Little Mermaid II: Return to the Sea (2000)
 The Little Mermaid: Ariel's Beginning (2008)
 Little Miss Marker: (1934 & 1980)
 Little Miss Millions (1993)
 Little Miss Nobody: (1917, 1923, 1933 & 1936)
 Little Miss Sunshine (2006)
 Little Monsters (1989)
 Little Moth (2007)
 Little Murder (2011)
 Little Murders (1971)
 Little Nellie Kelly (1940)
 Little Nemo (1911)
 Little Nemo: Adventures in Slumberland (1989)
 Little Nicky (2000)
 Little Odessa (1994)
 The Little Panda Fighter (2008)
 A Little Pond (2009)
 Little Prince (2008)
 The Little Prince:(1966, 1974 & 2015)
 A Little Princess: (1917, 1939, 1995 & 1997)
 The Little Rascals (1994)
 The Little Rascals Save the Day (2014)
 Little Red Flowers (2006)
 Little Red Monkey (1955)
 Little Red Riding Hood: (1920, 1922, 1953, 1954 & 1997)
 Little Red Riding Rabbit (1944)
 A Little Romance (1979)
 Little Secrets: (2001 & 2006)
 The Little Shop of Horrors (1960)
 Little Shop of Horrors (1986)
 Little Stranger (1934)
 The Little Stranger (2018)
 The Little Theatre of Jean Renoir (1970)
 The Little Thing: (1923 & 1938)
 Little Things (2014)
 The Little Things (2010)
 The Little Things (2021)
 Little Toys (1933)
 A Little Trip to Heaven (2005)
 The Little Vampire (2000)
 The Little Vampire 3D (2017)
 Little Vera (1988)
 Little Voice (1998)
 Little Witches (1996)
 Little Women: (1917, 1918, 1933, 1949, 1978 TV, 1994, 2018 & 2019)
 The Littlest Victims (1989)
 Live at the Aladdin Las Vegas (2003)
 Live from Baghdad (2002) (TV)
 Live Flesh (1998)
 Live Free or Die: (2000 & 2006)
 Live Free or Die Hard (2007)
 Live Hard (1989)
 Live and Let Die (1973)
 Live a Little, Love a Little (1968)
 Live Nude Girls (1995)
 Live Wire (1992)
 Liverpool: (2008 & 2012)
 The Lives of a Bengal Lancer (1935)
 The Lives of Others (2006)
 Living: (2012 & 2022)
 The Living Daylights (1987)
 The Living Dead at Manchester Morgue (1974)
 The Living Desert (1953)
 The Living Idol (1957)
 Living it Up (1954)
 Living in Oblivion (1995)
 Living Out Loud (1998)
 Living on Tokyo Time (1987)
 Livvakterna (2001)
 Liza (1972)
 Liza, the Fox-Fairy (2015)
 The Lizard (2004)
 A Lizard in a Woman's Skin (1973)
 The Lizzie McGuire Movie (2003)

Lj–Ll

 Ljeto u zlatnoj dolini (2003)
 Llévame contigo (1951)
 La Llorona: (1933, 1960 & 2019)
 Lloyd (2001)
 Lloyd the Conqueror (2011)
 Lloyd's of London (1936)

Lo

Loa–Lor

 Loaded Weapon 1 (1993)
 Loafing and Camouflage (1984)
 Loafing and Camouflage: Sirens in the Aegean (2005)
 La Loba (1965)
 The Lobo Paramilitary Christmas Special (2002)
 LOC: Kargil (2003)
 Local Hero (1983)
 Loch Ness (1996)
 Lock Up: (1989 & 2020)
 Lock, Stock and Two Smoking Barrels (1998)
 Lockdown: (1990, 2000, 2021 Bengali, 2021 English & 2021 Nigerian)
 Locke (2013)
 Lockout (2012)
 The Lodge (2019)
 The Lodger: (1932, 1944 & 2009)
 The Lodger: A Story of the London Fog (1927)
 Loft: (2005, 2008 & 2010)
 The Loft (2014)
 Logan (2017)
 Logan Lucky (2017)
 Logan's Run (1976)
 Loggerheads: (1978 & 2005)
 Loin (2001)
 Lokaneethi (1952)
 Lokis (1970)
 LOL: (2006 & 2012)
 LOL (Laughing Out Loud) (2008)
 Lola: (1961, 1969, 1974 & 1981)
 Lola Montès (1955)
 Lola Versus (2012)
 Lolita: (1962 & 1997)
 LolliLove (2004)
 The Lollipop Generation (2008)
 London: (1926, 2005 American & 2005 Indian)
 London After Midnight (1927)
 London Boulevard (2010)
 London to Brighton (2006)
 London Can Take It! (1940)
 London Fields (2018)
 London Has Fallen (2016)
 London Road (2015)
 London Voodoo (2004)
 London's Trafalgar Square (1890)
 The Lone Ranger: (1956, 2003 TV & 2013)
 The Lone Ranger and the Lost City of Gold (1958)
 Lone Star: (1952 & 1996)
 Lone Survivor (2013)
 Lone Wolf and Cub series:
 Lone Wolf and Cub: Baby Cart to Hades (1972)
 Lone Wolf and Cub: Baby Cart in the Land of Demons (1973)
 Lone Wolf and Cub: Baby Cart in Peril (1972)
 Lone Wolf and Cub: Baby Cart at the River Styx (1972)
 Lone Wolf and Cub: Sword of Vengeance (1972)
 Lone Wolf and Cub: White Heaven in Hell (1974)
 The Loneliness of the Long Distance Runner (1962)
 Lonely are the Brave (1962)
 The Lonely Guy (1984)
 Lonely Heart (1985)
 Lonely Hearts: (1970, 1982, 1991 & 2006)
 Lonely Island (2014)
 A Lonely Place to Die (2011)
 Lonely Water (1973)
 Lonelyhearts (1958)
 Loner (2008)
 Lonesome (1928)
 Lonesome Cowboys (1968)
 Lonesome Dove (1989)
 Lonesome Jim (2005)
 The Long Absence (1961) 	
 The Long Breakup (2020)  
 The Long Day Closes (1992)
 Long Day's Journey Into Night: (1962 & 2018)
 The Long Good Friday (1980)
 The Long Goodbye (1973)
 The Long Gray Line (1955)
 The Long Kiss Goodnight (1996)
 Long Live the King: (1923 & 2019)
 Long Live the Queen (1995)
 Long Live the Republic! (1965)
 The Long Night: (1947 & 2022)
 A Long Ride from Hell (1968)
 The Long Riders (1980)
 The Long Ships (1964)
 The Long Shot (2019)
 Long Time Dead (2002)
 The Long Voyage Home (1940)
 The Long Walk (2019)
 The Long Walk to Finchley (2008) (TV)
 A Long Way Down (2014)
 Long Way North (2015)
 Long Weekend: (1978, 2008 & 2021)
 The Long, Hot Summer (1958)
 The Long, Long Trailer (1954)
 Long-Haired Hare (1949)
 The Longest Day (1962)
 The Longest Night in Shanghai (2007)
 The Longest Yard: (1974 & 2005)
 Longinus (2004)
 Longshot: The Movie (1999)
 Longtime Companion (1989)
 Look Away (2018)
 Look Back in Anger: (1959 & 1980)
 Look Both Ways: (2005 & 2022)
 The Look of Love (2013)
 Look at Me (2004)
 Look for the Silver Lining (1949)
 Look What's Happened to Rosemary's Baby (1976) (TV)
 Look Who's Back (2015)
 Look Who's Talking series:
 Look Who's Talking (1989)
 Look Who's Talking Too (1990)
 Look Who's Talking Now (1993)
 Looker (1981)
 Lookin' to Get Out (1982)
 Looking for Alibrandi (2000)
 Looking for Comedy in the Muslim World (2005)
 Looking for Eric (2009)
 Looking for Fidel (2004)
 Looking for Mr. Goodbar (1977)
 Looking for Oum Kulthum (2017)
 Looking for Richard (1996)
 The Lookout: (1990, 2007 & 2012)
 Looks That Kill (2020)
 Loon Lake (2019)
 Looney Tunes: Back in Action (2003)
 Loop: (1997, 1999 & 2020)
 Looper (2012)
 Loophole: (1954 & 1981)
 Loot: (1970, 2008, 2011 & 2012)
 Lootera (2013)
 The Looters (1967)
 Lope (2010)
 Loqueesha (2019)
 Lora (2007)
 Lora from Morning Till Evening (2011)
 Lorai: Play to Live (2015)
 The Lorax (2012)
 Lord Arthur Savile's Crime (1920)
 Lord Byron (2011)
 Lord Edgware Dies (1934)
 Lord of the Flies: (1963 & 1990)
 Lord, Give Me Patience (2017)
 Lord of Illusions (1995)
 Lord Jim: (1925 & 1965)
 Lord John in New York (1915)
 Lord of the Jungle (1955)
 Lord and Lady Algy (1919)
 Lord Livingstone 7000 Kandi (2015)
 Lord Love a Duck (1966)
 Lord of the Manor (1933)
 Lord of the Night (1927)
 Lord Reginald's Derby Ride (1924)
 The Lord of the Rings (1978)
 Lord of the Rings series:
 The Lord of the Rings: The Fellowship of the Ring (2001)
 The Lord of the Rings: The Return of the King (2003)
 The Lord of the Rings: The Two Towers (2002)
 Lord of Shanghai (2016)
 Lord of Tears (2013)
 Lord of the Universe (1974) (TV)
 Lord of War (2005)
 The Lord's Lantern in Budapest (1999)
 Lords of Chaos (2018)
 Lords of the Deep (1989)
 Lords of Dogtown (2005)
 The Lords of Flatbush (1974)
 The Lords of Salem (2012)
 Lords of the Street (2008)
 Lore (2012)
 Lorelei (2020)
 Lorelei: The Witch of the Pacific Ocean (2005)
 Lorena, Light-Footed Woman (2019)
 Loren Cass (2006)
 Lorenzaccio (1951)
 Lorenzo (2004)
 Lorenzo Ruiz: The Saint... A Filipino (1988)
 Lorenzo's Oil (1992)
 Lorna (1964)
 Lorna's Silence (2008)

Los–Lou

 Los Angeles Plays Itself (2004)
 Loser (2000)
 The Loser Takes It All (2002)
 The Losers (2010)
 Losin' It (1983)
 Losing Isaiah (1995)
 The Loss of Sexual Innocence (1999)
 Lost & Found (1999)
 The Lost 15 Boys: The Big Adventure on Pirates' Island (2013)
 Lost in America (1985)
 The Lost Battalion (1919)
 Lost in Beijing (2007)
 The Lost Bladesman (2011)
 The Lost Boys series:
 The Lost Boys (1987)
 Lost Boys: The Thirst (2010)
 Lost Boys: The Tribe (2008)
 The Lost City: (1950, 1955, 2005 & 2022)
 The Lost City of Z (2016)
 Lost in the Dark: (1914, 1947 & 2007 TV)
 The Lost Daughter (2021)
 Lost and Delirious (2001)
 Lost in Florence (2017)
 Lost and Found: (1979, 1996, 2008 & 2016 American & 2016 Indian)
 Lost Girls (2020)
 Lost Girls & Love Hotels (2020)
 Lost in a Harem (1944)
 Lost Highway (1997)
 The Lost Honour of Katharina Blum (1975)
 Lost Horizon: (1937 & 1973)
 Lost Illusions (2021)
 Lost Indulgence (2008)
 Lost Junction (2003)
 Lost in the Legion (1934)
 The Lost Leonardo (2021)
 A Lost Letter (1953)
 The Lost Letter: (1945 & 1972)
 Lost in London (2017)
 Lost in La Mancha (2002)
 The Lost Moment (1947)
 Lost Patrol (1929)
 The Lost Patrol (1934)
 The Lost Sermon (1914)
 The Lost Skeleton of Cadavra (2001)
 The Lost Son (1999)
 Lost Soul: The Doomed Journey of Richard Stanley's Island of Dr. Moreau (2014)
 Lost Souls: (1998 TV & 2000)
 Lost in Space (1998)
 The Lost Squadron (1932)
 Lost in Translation (2003)
 Lost Transmissions (2019)
 The Lost Tribe: (1949, 1985 & 2010)
 The Lost Village (1947)
 The Lost Weekend (1945)
 Lost in White (2016)
 The Lost World: (1925, 1960, 1992, 1998 & 2001 TV)
 The Lost World: Jurassic Park (1997)
 Lost in Wrestling (2015)
 A Lot Like Love (2005)
 Lotna (1979)
 Lotte from Gadgetville (2006)
 Lotte and the Moonstone Secret (2011)
 Lotus Code (2015)
 Lotus Lantern (1999)
 Lou (2022)
 Louie Bluie (1985)
 Louisiana Purchase (1941)
 Louisiana Story (1948)

Lov-Loy

 Love: (1919 American, 1919 German, 1920, 1927 American, 1927 German, 1956, 1971, 1991 Indian, 1991 Soviet, 2004, 2005, 2008 Bengali, 2008 Indonesian, 2011, 2012, 2015, 2020 & 2021)
 Love 'em and Weep (1927)
 Love and a .45 (1994)
 Love Actually (2003)
 Love Affair: (1932, 1939, 1994 & unreleased)
 Love Affairs (1927)
 Love Again (2023)
 Love and Leashes (2022)
 Love in the Afternoon: (1957 & 1972)
 Love Is on the Air (1937)
 Love Is All You Need (2012)
 Love All You Have Left (2017)
 Love Among the Ruins (1975) (TV)
 Love and Anarchy (1973)
 Love & Basketball (2000)
 Love Beats Rhymes (2017)
 Love Between the Raindrops (1979)
 The Love Bug: (1969 & 1997)
 Love Camp 7 (1969)
 Love Clinic (2015)
 Love on the Cloud (2014)
 Love is Colder than Death (1969)
 Love Contractually (2017)
 Love the Coopers (2015)
 Love Crazy: (1941 & 1991)
 Love and Death (1975)
 Love and Death on Long Island (1997)
 Love Is the Devil: Study for a Portrait of Francis Bacon (1998)
 Love on a Diet (2001)
 The Love Doctor (1929)
 Love on the Dole (1941)
 Love Don't Cost a Thing (2003)
 Love and Duty: (1916 & 1931)
 The Love Eterne (1963)
 Love Exposure (2008)
 Love Express: (2016 & 2018)
 Love Field (1992)
 Love Finds Andy Hardy (1938)
 Love, At First… (2015)
 Love at First Bite (1979)
 Love, Gilda (2018)
 The Love Guru (2008)
 Love Happens (2009)
 Love Happy (1949)
 Love Hard (2021)
 Love the Hard Way (2003)
 Love and Honor: (2006 & 2013)
 Love and Human Remains (1993)
 Love Hurts: (1990, 1993 & 2009)
 The Love of Jeanne Ney (1927)
 Love Jones (1997)
 Love Kills (1998)
 Love and Kisses (1965)
 Love Letter: (1953, 1975, 1985 & 1995)
 The Love Letter: (1923, 1998 TV & 1999)
 Love Letters: (1917, 1924, 1944, 1945, 1984 & 1999 TV)
 Love Lies Bleeding: (1999 & 2008)
 Love Live! The School Idol Movie (2015)
 Love Liza (2003)
 Love Is Love Is Love (2020)
 Love in Magic (2005)
 Love is a Many-Splendored Thing (1955)
 Love Me If You Dare (2003)
 Love Me or Leave Me (1955)
 Love Me Tender (1956)
 Love Me Tonight (1932)
 Love Meetings (1965)
 Love & Mercy (2014)
 Love and Monsters (2020)
 Love O2O (2016)
 Love Object (2003)
 Love and Other Catastrophes (1996)
 Love & Other Drugs (2010)
 The Love Parade (1929)
 Love & Peace (2015)
 Love Phobia (2006)
 Love Potion No. 9 (1992)
 Love with the Proper Stranger (1963)
 Love on the Run: (1936 & 1979)
 Love Serenade (1996)
 Love & Sex (2000)
 Love Sick (2006)
 Love, Simon (2018)
 Love Slaves of the Amazons (1957)
 A Love Song for Bobby Long (2004)
 Love Stinks (1999)
 Love Stories (1997)
 Love Story: (1925, 1942, 1943, 1944, 1970, 1981, 1986, 2006, 2008, 2011 Indonesian, 2011 New Zealand, 2012, 2013, 2020 & 2021)
 A Love Story: (1933, 2007 & 2016)
 The Love Story of Aliette Brunton (1924)
 The Love Story of Cesare Ubaldi (1922)
 Love Streams (1984)
 Love Studio (2016)
 Love and Suicide: (2005 & 2006)
 The Love Suicides at Sonezaki: (1978 & 1981)
 The Love of Sunya (1927)
 Love and Support (2003)
 Love That Boy (2003)
 Love in Thoughts (2004)
 Love in the Time of Cholera (2007)
 Love Unto Death (1984)
 Love Unto Waste (1986)
 Love! Valour! Compassion! (1997)
 The Love Witch (2016)
 Love Without Distance (2015)
 Love's Berries (1926)
 Love's Brother (2004)
 Love's Joys and Woes (1926)
 Love's Labor Lost (1920)
 Love's Labour's Lost (2000)
 Love's Whirlpool: (1924 & 2014)
 Love, Honour and Obey (2000)
 Love, So Divine (2004)
 The Lovebirds (2020)
 The Loved One (1965)
 The Loved Ones (2010)
 Lovelife (1996)
 Lovely & Amazing (2001)
 The Lovely Bones (2009)
 Lovely Molly (2012)
 Lovely Rivals (2004)
 Lovely, Still (2008)
 The Lover: (1986, 1992, 2002 & 2016)
 Lover Come Back (1961)
 Lover's Grief over the Yellow River (1999)
 Loverboy: (1989 & 2005)
 The Lovers: (1946, 1958 & 1994)
 Lovers of the Arctic Circle (1998)
 The Lovers on the Bridge (1999)
 Lovers Lane: (1999 & 2005)
 Lovers and Liars (1979)
 The Lovers of Montparnasse (1958)
 Lovers & Movies (2015)
 Lovers and Other Strangers (1970)
 Lovers Rock (2020)
 Lovers' Concerto (2002)
 Lovers' Lane (1924)
 Lovers' Rock (1964)
 Loves of a Blonde (1965)
 The Loves of Carmen: (1927 & 1948)
 The Loves of Casanova (1927)
 Lovewrecked (2005)
 Lovin' Molly (1974)
 Loving: (1970 & 2016)
 Loving Adults (2022)
 Loving Couples: (1964 & 1980)
 Loving Vincent (2017)
 Loving You: (1957, 2003 TV & 2008)
 A Low Down Dirty Shame (1994)
 Lower City (2006)
 The Lower Depths: (1936 & 1957)
 Loyalties: (1933 & 1986)

Lu

 Lu, the Coquette (1918)
 Lu over the Wall (2017)

Lua-Lum

 Luanda, The Music Factory (2009)
 Luboml: My Heart Remembers (2003)
 Luca: (2019 & 2021)
 Lucania (2019)
 Lucanus Cervus (1910)
 Lucas (1986)
 Lucciola (1917)
 Luchino Visconti (1999)
 Lucia (2013)
 Lucia's Grace (2018)
 Lucid (2005)
 Lucid Dream (2017)
 Lucie (1963)
 Lucie Aubrac (1997)
 Lucifer (2019)
 Lucifer Rising (1972)
 Lucifer's Women (1974)
 Lucifera: Demon Lover (1972)
 Lucile (1927)
 Lucille Love, Girl of Mystery (1914)
 Lucio Flavio (1977)
 Luck: (1931, 2003, 2009 & 2022)
 Luck by Chance (2009)
 The Luck of the Irish: (1920, 1936, 1948 & 2001 TV)
 Luck Key (2016)
 Luck Luck Ki Baat (2012 TV)
 Luck of the Navy (1938)
 The Luck of the Navy (1927)
 Luck in Pawn (1919)
 Luck of the Turf (1936)
 Lucky (2019 TV)
 Lucky Bastard: (2009 & 2013)
 Lucky Break: (1994 & 2001)
 Lucky Day (2002)
 Lucky Grandma (2019)
 Lucky Jordan (1942)
 Lucky Loser (2006)
 Lucky Luciano (1973)
 Lucky Number Slevin (2006)
 Lucky Numbers (2000)
 The Lucky One (2012)
 The Lucky Ones (2008)
 Lucky Star 2015 (2015)
 The Lucky Texan (1934)
 Lucky Them (2013)
 Lucky Three: an Elliott Smith Portrait (1997)
 Lucky You (2007)
 Lucky: No Time for Love (2005)
 Luckytown (2000)
 Lucy: (2003 TV & 2014)
 Ludo (2020)
 Ludwig (1973)
 Ludwig II: (1922 & 2012)
 Ludwig: Requiem for a Virgin King (1972)
 Lullaby of the Earth (1976)
 Lulu: (1914, 1918, 1953, 1962, 1996 & 2014)
 Lulu on the Bridge (1998)
 Luminal (2004)
 Luminous Moss (1992)
 Lumière and Company (1995)

Lun-Luz

 Luna: (1965 & 2017)
 La Luna (1979)
 Luna Caliente (2009)
 Luna di miele in tre (1976)
 Luna e l'altra (1996)
 Luna Papa (1999)
 Luna Park: (1960 & 1992)
 Lunacy (2005)
 Lunana: A Yak in the Classroom (2019)
 Lunar Eclipse (1999)
 Lunarcy! (2012)
 Lunatics: A Love Story (1991)
 Lunatics and Lovers (1976)
 Lunch with Charles (2001)
 Lunch Hour (1962)
 Lunch Meat (1987)
 Lunch Wagon (1981)
 Lunch Time Heroes (2015)
 The Lunchbox (2013)
 Lunegarde (1946)
 Lungi (2019)
 Lupin the Third series:
 Lupin the 3rd (2014)
 Lupin the 3rd vs. Detective Conan: The Movie (2013)
 Lupin III: Dead or Alive (1996)
 Lupin III: Farewell to Nostradamus (1995)
 Lupin III: Goemon Ishikawa's Spray of Blood (2017)
 Lupin III: Jigen's Gravestone (2014)
 Lupin III: Legend of the Gold of Babylon (1985)
 Lupin III: Strange Psychokinetic Strategy (2011)
 Lupin the Third: The Castle of Cagliostro (1979)
 Lupo the Butcher (1987)
 The Lure: (1914, 1933 & 2015)
 Lure of Ambition (1919)
 Lure of the Circus (1918)
 Lure of the Gold (1922)
 Lure of the Islands (1942)
 Lure of the Night Club (1927)
 Lure of the Swamp (1957)
 Lure of the Wasteland (1939)
 Lure of the West (1926)
 The Lure of the Wild (1925)
 Lure of the Wilderness (1952)
 Lush (2000)
 Lust (2010)
 Lust for Freedom (1987)
 Lust for Gold (1949)
 Lust for Life: (1922 & 1956)
 Lust Stories (2010)
 Lust for a Vampire (1971)
 Lust, Caution (2007)
 Luster (2002)
 Luther: (1928, 1964 TV, 1973 & 2003)
 Luther: The Fallen Sun (2023)
 Luther the Geek (1989)
 Luther Metke at 94 (1979)
 Luu Yadanar Treasure (2016)
 Luv (1967)
 LUV (2013)
 Luv Ka The End (2011)
 Luv Ni Love Storys (2020)
 Luv Shuv Tey Chicken Khurana (2012)
 Luv U Alia (2016)
 Luv U Soniyo (2013)
 Lux Æterna (2019)
 Luxo Jr. (1986)
 Luxor (2020)
 Luxury Cabin (1959)
 Luxury Car (2006)
 Luxury Hotel (1992)
 Luxury Liner: (1933 & 1948)
 Luz: (2018, 2019 & 2020)
 Luz del Fuego (1982)
 The Luzhin Defence (2000)
 Luzzu (2021)

Ly

 Lycanthropus (1962)
 Lyckan kommer (1942)
 Lydia (1941)
 The Lyin' Hunter (1937)
 Lying (2006)
 Lying Eyes (1996)
 Lying Lips: (1921 & 1939)
 Lying and Stealing (2019)
 Lying in Wait (2001)
 Lyiza (2011)
 Lykkens musikanter (1962)
 Lyle (2014)
 Lyle, Lyle, Crocodile (2022)
 Lymelife (2009)
 The Lyons Mail: (1916 & 1931)
 The Lyons in Paris (1955)
 The Lyre of Delight (1978)

Previous:  List of films: J–K    Next:  List of films: M

See also

 Lists of films
 Lists of actors
 List of film and television directors
 List of documentary films
 List of film production companies

-